Marija Maraš (born 23 September 2002) is a Montenegrin footballer who plays as a defender for 1. ŽFL club ŽFK Breznica and the Montenegro women's national team.

References

2002 births
Living people
Women's association football defenders
Montenegrin women's footballers
Montenegro women's international footballers
ŽFK Breznica players